Pescara Porta Nuova is a railway station in Pescara, Italy. The station opened in 1883 and is located on the Adriatic railway and Rome–Sulmona–Pescara railway. The train services are operated by Trenitalia.

History
Until 1927 the station was named simply Pescara since it is located in the old town of Pescara, located south of the river.

Modernisation
On 15 January 2009 the new passenger building was completed, designed by the Spanish architect Oriol Bohigas and cost tens of millions of euros. The original building was in a state of decay, and therefore was demolished, however leaving the old front of the building as an element of the new building. The work was carried out as part of the redevelopment of the area "The Mill".

The station has three tracks, two of which loops to the Adriatic line. The third is the start of the Rome-Pescara railway. Work is under way to upgrade the station, increasing the number of tracks to 4 and building three platforms to modern European standards, with shelters, subways and various furnishings. The works are carried out by RFI, costing about 10 million. These interventions will help increasing the line speed on the Adriatic. the work will be completed in the first half of 2016.

Train services
The station is served by the following service(s):

Regional services (Treno regionale) Rimini - Ancona - Pescara - Termoli
Regional services (Treno regionale) Pescara - Chieti - Sulmona - Avezzano - Tivoli - Rome
Regional services (Treno regionale) Teramo - Giulianova - Pescara - Chieti - Sulmona - Avezzano

References

This article is based upon a translation of the Italian language version as at February 2016.

Railway stations in Abruzzo
Buildings and structures in the Province of Pescara